Ybry is a French luxury perfume and fashion house founded in 1925 by Simon Jaroslawski. It formerly resided at 6 rue Ybry, Neuilly (Seine). In 2005 the brand was revitalized and the trademark and original bottle designs were filed for international protection. Amanda Witteman is the company's spokesmodel.

History
Simon Jaroslawski, a respected 'nose' (perfumer) in the perfume industry, pioneered the (then) modern abstract geometric design for his bottles. He held very strong artistic views. He created perfumes for the emancipated young women of the era. A distinguishing feature of the Ybry line are the bottle designs. Ybry also had an office in New York City. Ybry perfumes were advertised as being "the most expensive in the world". During the Great Depression the unemployment and panic in the United States had a chilling effect on the fortunes of the French luxury trades. The production costs of the prestigious and luxurious Ybry creations weakened the financial position of the company and Simon Jaroslawski fell into personal bankruptcy in 1932. The original Ybry brand continued to exist in the USA until the 1940s.

Products

Cooperation with Lalique and Baccarat
Jaroslawski collaborated with Baccarat bottle design but commissioned Lalique to create the Art Nouveau glass medallions. Baccarat produced the classic Ybry perfume bottle, a flattened square in colored crystal. The bottles consisted of white crystal overlaid with colored crystal to create a unique luminescent opacity. Each color delineated a specific perfume and a different gem. The colors include red, jet black, slag green to darker green, orange to butterscotch, and deep purple to lavender. The bottles generally included matching enameled and gilded metal covers. The covers were placed over stoppers at an angle on one corner of the bottle. The atomizers were given either chrome or gilt brass hardware. The colored bottles came with round, gold foil embossed labels, the black bottles with square, silver foil embossed labels. This bottle received a patent granted on 1925.
The bottles ranged in size from 7 7/8" tall down to diminutive sample sizes of just 1 3/8" tall. The presentation boxes were covered with fine leather and often had color-coordinated small triangular segments and luxurious silk tassels. Other boxes looked like little suitcases and were covered in suede, and held multiple presentations, such as three bottles and two atomizers. Another rare example held two bottles, one atomizer and a Lalique medallion attached to the case with a silk tassel.

The vintage perfumes of the Ybry line
1925 Mon Ame
1925 Femmes de Paris
1927 Desir du Coeur
1927 Devinez
1928 Les Bourgeons
1929 Amour Sauvage
1929 Les Fleurs d'Ybry
1929 Un Soir de Ma Vie
1931 Toujours l'Amaint
1932 L'Amour Toujours
1935 Joie de Vivre
1935 Hearts Desire
1939 Odorade
1939 Old Fashion Garden
1940 French Bouquet
1940 Eau de Cologne
1940 French Cologne
1940 Naturelle
1940 Honeysuckle
1940 Wild Daphne
1942 Palo Alto
1944 The Buds
Infusion de Fleurs
Mon desir

The relaunch
The perfumes Amour Sauvage, Femme de Paris, Desire du Cœur, Mon Ame, Devinez and Ruban Rose (Pink Ribbon) are offered in coloured crystal bottles with engraved and enamelled square brass toppers. Each perfume has a different colour bottle, black for Amour Sauvage emerald green for Femme de Paris, ruby red for Desir du Coeur, amethyst for Mon Ame, coral for Devinez and pink for Ruban Rose. The Ruban Rose was released in dedication to breast cancer survivors and victims.

Current activities
Specializing in luxury goods (haute couture, ready-to-wear, handbags, perfumery, cosmetics, etc.), the YBRY label is striving to become a recognized name in the fashion industry.

Kapsule the Lagerfeld imitation
In August 2008 Karl Lagerfeld introduced Kapsule to the luxury perfume market. Although Luz Herrmann and Karl Lagerfeld claim original design, the bottle is an exact copy of the famous Ybry bottles.

References

External links
 Maison Ybry

Cosmetics companies of France
Privately held companies of the Netherlands
Companies based in Amsterdam